Almukhametovo (Älmöxämät) is a rural locality (a village) in Almukhametovsky Selsoviet, Abzelilovsky District, Bashkortostan, Russia. The population was 659 as of 2010. There are 10 streets.

Geography 
Almukhametovo is located 46 km south of Askarovo (the district's administrative centre) by road. Tselinny is the nearest rural locality.

References 

Rural localities in Abzelilovsky District